"We Ain't What We Was": Civil Rights in the New South is a 1997 non-fiction book by Frederick M. Wirt, published by Duke University Press.

The book is how Panola County, Mississippi's situation changed after laws protecting African-Americans' rights were enacted.

The title is taken from a common phrase among African-American residents of Panola County which highlights how their situation had improved.

Anne Permaloff of Auburn University stated that the book considers Panola County to be "a metaphor for change throughout the South."

Background
This book is a continuation of Wirt's previous book, The Politics of Southern Equality, published in 1970.

Contents
Wirt's book argued that while African-Americans gained more rights, integration did not occur culturally, and so black and white residents continued to have race-segregated religious practices and friendships.

Reception
Richard L. Engstrom of the University of New Orleans felt that the book is the strongest with analyzing the economic and educational changes, while the political coverage was "weaker".

Glenn Feldman of the University of Alabama at Birmingham described the book as "interesting and useful", as well as "valuable".

Permaloff argued that the book "is fascinating and makes the book worthwhile reading" due to the content about Panola County, although she felt that the book did not "adequately document southern-wide interpretations".

References
 
 
  - Note that this PDF document has another set of page numbers on the outside, of which the article is on 141-142, and the PDF document file numbers these pages as p. 142-143/153.

Notes

Further reading
 
 
 
 
 
  - Profile at journal website

External links
 We Ain't What We Was - Duke University Press
Panola County, Mississippi
Duke University Press books
1997 books
Books about Mississippi